Peneplain Peak is a peak (2,650 m) located midway along Hampton Ridge, which lies between Montgomerie Glacier and Mackellar Glacier in Queen Alexandra Range. So named by the Ohio State University Geological Party, 1967–68, because an excellent exposure of the "Kukri Peneplain," an ancient erosion surface, is present on the peak.

Mountains of the Ross Dependency
Shackleton Coast